Rogério Miguel Reis da Silva (born 5 April 1997) is a Portuguese footballer.

Football career
On 15 November 2014, Silva made his professional debut with Trofense in a 2014–15 Segunda Liga match against Vitória Guimarães B.

References

External links

Stats and profile at LPFP 

1997 births
Footballers from Porto
Living people
Portuguese footballers
Association football forwards
Liga Portugal 2 players
C.D. Trofense players
Olympiakos Nicosia players